Excelsior JET is a now-defunct proprietary Java SE technology implementation built around an ahead-of-time (AOT) Java to native code compiler. The compiler transforms the portable Java bytecode into optimized executables for the desired hardware and operating system (OS). Also included are a Java runtime featuring a just-in-time (JIT) compiler for handling classes that were not precompiled for whatever reason (e.g. third-party plugins or dynamic proxies), the complete Java SE API implementation licensed from Oracle, and a toolkit to aid deployment of the optimized applications. Excelsior JET is developed by Excelsior LLC, headquartered in Novosibirsk, Russia.

Overview
Excelsior JET has passed the "official" test suite (TCK) for Java SE 8, and is certified Java Compatible on macOS and a number of Windows and Linux flavors running on Intel x86, AMD64/Intel 64 and compatible hardware. (The macOS version is 64-bit only.)

The Enterprise Edition supports the Equinox OSGi runtime at the JVM level, enabling ahead-of-time compilation of Eclipse RCP (Rich Client Platform) applications, and version 7.0 added such support for Web applications running on Apache Tomcat.
Version 10.5 introduced a new garbage collector optimized for multi-core and multi-CPU systems

Excelsior JET Embedded implements the Java SE for Embedded technology in a very similar manner. The only major differences used to be in licensing and pricing, but as of the latest version Excelsior JET Embedded also supports ARM-based platforms.

Latest Release
Version 15 introduced incremental compilation for AMD64 and ARM targets and improved application performance across all platforms.

Product EOL
On May 15, 2019, Excelsior announced discontinuation of Excelsior JET in an e-mail to their customers and next day also on their website. Support was announced to be stopped and the engineering team to leave completely within only ~2 weeks ("early June 2019") and Website for downloads announced to be offline mid of June (within only ~4 weeks). At August 7, 2019, it was announced Excelsior was acquired by Huawei.

See also

 GNU Compiler for Java (removed from GCC in October 2016)

References

External links

 Excelsior JET Homepage
 Improve Startup Time of Java Applications
 Reduce Download Size of Java Applications
 Profile-Guided Optimization
 Huawei acquires Russian developer Excelsior

Java development tools
Discontinued Java virtual machines